Baiza may refer to:
Joe Baiza (b. 1952), musician
Baiza, Iran, a village in Razavi Khorasan Province, Iran